Dr. Grace Holloway is a fictional character played by Daphne Ashbrook in the 1996 television film Doctor Who, a continuation of the long-running British science fiction television series Doctor Who. A cardiologist from San Francisco in 1999, she assists the Eighth Doctor in defeating the renegade Time Lord, the Master.

Character history
When the Seventh Doctor lands on December 30, 1999 in San Francisco, he is gunned down by a gang on the streets of Chinatown. Unaware of his alien physiology, Grace accidentally kills him when she attempts to operate. He subsequently regenerates into his eighth incarnation, and involves Grace in his fight to prevent the Master from opening the Eye of Harmony and destroying the Earth at the stroke of midnight on New Year's Day, 2000. At the end, the Doctor offers to take Grace along with him in the TARDIS, but Grace declines, preferring to stay behind and apply the lessons she has learned from him.

Grace is described by the Doctor as "tired of life but afraid of dying." She is a warm and compassionate person who was disillusioned early in life when she realized that she could not hold back death. As a result, she puts on a cold, aloof front in an effort to protect herself from her feelings and to mask her own insecurity. She realizes this over the course of her adventure with the Doctor and learns to feel hope again, placing it in the form of the Doctor, an alien who can literally come back to life, as well as regaining confidence in herself as a medical practitioner and as a person. She also rapidly develops a romantic attachment to the Doctor, stating at one point, "I finally meet the right guy and he's from another planet."

Other appearances
Grace's life after her encounter with the Doctor is not explored on-screen beyond the television movie, although the Doctor does have to deal with the after effects of those events in the spin-off Eighth Doctor Adventures novel Unnatural History, by Kate Orman and Jonathan Blum.

Grace appears in the Doctor Who comic strip story The Fallen, published in Doctor Who Magazine #273-#276, where she conducts experiments to merge human and Time Lord DNA, the latter obtained from tissue left behind by the Master. However, the Master is not in his Time Lord body, but that of a shape-shifting creature known as a morphant. The resulting hybrid begins to consume people, but is stopped with the Eighth Doctor's help. Grace promises the Doctor she will destroy all the remaining morphant DNA samples, and the two part ways once more. She subsequently appears as a dream image in The Glorious Dead (DWM #287-#296) and makes a one-panel cameo in the last regular Eighth Doctor comic strip adventure, The Flood (DWM #353). In Prisoners of Time, a series to celebrate the 50th anniversary, the Doctor meets her soon after the events of the TV Movie. She travels with him for a while but is overwhelmed by what she sees. Before the Doctor can return her to Earth, she is kidnapped by Adam Mitchell, who is travelling through time to kidnap the Doctor's companions.

Daphne Ashbrook performed in the Big Finish Productions audio play The Next Life opposite Paul McGann as the Eighth Doctor, but playing a different character named Perfection.

Legal issues
Originally, Grace Holloway was to appear in the second Eighth Doctor novel, Vampire Science, but legal issues with the BBC and Universal prevented this from happening. According to Big Finish, their audioplays cannot use TV-movie characters Grace Holloway or Chang Lee due to Universal's ownership of the characters. Grace's appearance in the comics appears to have been separately negotiated.

References

External links

 Grace Holloway on the BBC's Doctor Who website

Television characters introduced in 1996
Doctor Who companions
Female characters in film
Fictional surgeons
Fictional characters from San Francisco
Fictional people from the 20th-century